This is a list of topics in molecular biology. See also index of biochemistry articles.



# 
2010107G12Rik - 3' end - 3' flanking region- 3110001I22Rik - 4932414N04Rik - 4933425L06Rik - 5' end - 5' flanking region - 5'-ribose- 3' -

A 
acrylamide gels - adenine - adenosine deaminase deficiency - adenovirus - agarose gel electrophoresis - agarose gel - akaryocyte - Alagille syndrome - alkaline lysis - allele - amino acids - amino terminus - amp resistance - amplification - amplicon - anchor sequence - animal model - anneal - anti-sense strand - antibiotic resistance - antibody - antisense - antisense strand - AP-1 site - apoptosis - assembled epitope - ataxia-telangiectasia - ATG or AUG - autoimmune lymphoproliferative syndrome - autoradiography - autosomal dominant - autosome - avidin -

B 
B5 protein domain - BAC - back mutation - bacteria - bacterial artificial chromosome - bacteriophage - bacteriophage lambda - band shift assay - base - base pair - binding site - biological organisation - biological process- Biomolecule Stretching Database - biotin - Biomolecule Stretching Database - birth defect - blotting - blunt end - bone marrow transplantation - box - BP - BRCA1 - BRCA2 - Brix (database) - BURP domain -

C 
C terminus - Can f 1 - cancer - candidate gene - Canonical sequence - cap - cap site - carboxyl terminus - carcinoma - carrier - CAT assay - CCAAT box - cDNA - cDNA clone - cDNA library - cell - centimorgan - centromere - chain terminator - chaperone protein - chromosome - Chromosomal translocation - chromosome walking - CIS - cistron - clone (genetics) - clone (noun) - clone (verb) - cloning - coding sequence - coding strand - codon - codon usage bias - competent - complementary - conformational epitope - congenital - consensus sequence - conservative substitution - conserved - contig - cosmid - CpG - craniosynostosis - cystic fibrosis - cytogenetic map - cytosine -

D 
database search - degeneracy (biology) - deletion - denaturation - denaturing gel - deoxyribonuclease (DNase) - deoxyribonucleic acid - deoxyribonucleotide - diabetes mellitus - dideoxy sequencing - dideoxyribonucleotide - diploid - direct repeat - DNA ligase -DNA Bank - DNA polymerase - DNA replication - DNA sequencing - DNase - dominant - dot blot - double helix - downstream (DNA) - downstream (transduction) - ds - duplex -

E 
E. coli - Ecotin - EIF-W2 protein domain - electrophoresis - electroporation - ELFV dehydrogenase - Ellis–van Creveld syndrome - end labeling - endonuclease - enhancer - enzyme - epitope - ethidium bromide - evolutionary clock - evolutionary footprinting - exon - exonuclease - expression - expression clone - expression vector -

F 
familial Mediterranean fever - FDC-SP - fibroblasts - fluorescence in situ hybridization -fluorophore-assisted carbohydrate electrophoresis - footprinting - Fragile X syndrome - frameshift mutation - fusion protein -

G 
GalP (protein) - gel electrophoresis - gel shift - gel shift assay - gene - gene amplification - gene conversion - gene expression - gene mapping - gene pool - gene therapy - gene transfer - genetic code - genetic counseling - genetic map - genetic marker - genetic screening - genetically modified mouse - genome - genomic blot - genomic clone - genomic library - genotype - germ line - glycoprotein - glycosylation - Golgi apparatus - GRE - guanine -

H 
hairpin - haploid - haploinsufficiency - helix-loop-helix - helminth protein - hematopoietic stem cell - hemophilia - heteroduplex DNA - heterozygous - highly conserved sequence - Hirschsprung's disease - histone - hnRNA - holoprosencephaly - homologous recombination - homology - homozygous - host strain (bacterial) - HspQ protein domain - human artificial chromosome - Human Genome Project - human immunodeficiency virus - Huntington's disease - hybridization - hybridoma - hydrophilicity plot -

I 
immunoblot - immunoprecipitation - immunotherapy - in situ hybridization - in vitro translation - inducer - inherited - initiation codon - insert - insertion - insertion sequence - intellectual property rights - intergenic - intron - inverted repeat - IscR stability element -

J 
junk DNA

K 
karyotype - kilobase - kinase - Klenow fragment - Knock-down - knock-out - knock-out experiment - knockout - Kozak sequence

L 
lambda - Laser capture microdissection - latarcin - leucine zipper - leukemia - library - ligase - linear epitope - linkage - linker protein - lipofectin - locus - LOD score - lymphocyte -

M 
M13 phage - malformation - mapping - marker - melanoma - melting - Johann Mendel - Mendelian inheritance - message - messenger RNA - metaphase - microarray technology - microsatellite - minusheet perfusion culture system - Mir-188 microRNA precursor family - Mir-615 microRNA precursor family - Mir-675 microRNA precursor family - missense mutation - mitochondrial DNA - mobility shift - molecular weight size marker - monoclonal antibody - monosomy - mouse model - mRNA - multicistronic message - multicopy plasmid - multiple cloning site - multiple endocrine neoplasia, type 1 - mutation -

N 
N terminus - native gel - nested PCR - neurofibromatosis - nick (DNA) - nick translation - Niemann-Pick disease, type C - non-coding DNA - non-coding strand - non-directiveness - nonconservative substitution - nonsense codon - nonsense mutation - nontranslated RNA - Northern blot - NT - nuclear run-on - nuclease - nuclease protection assay - nucleoside - nucleotide - Nucleotide universal IDentifier - nucleus -

O 
oligo - oligodeoxyribonucleotide - oligonucleotide - oncogene - oncovirus - open reading frame - operator - operon - origin of replication -

P 
p53 - package - palindromic sequence - Parkinson's disease - pBR322 - PCR - pedigree - peptide - peptide bond - phage - phagemid - phenotype - phosphatase, alkaline - phosphodiester bond - phosphorylation - physical map - plasmid - point mutation - poly-A track - polyA tail - polyacrylamide gel - polyclonal antibodies - polydactyly - polymerase - polymerase chain reaction - polymorphism - polynucleotide kinase - polypeptide - positional cloning - post-transcriptional regulation - post-translational modification - post-translational processing - post-translational regulation - PRE - precursor mRNA - primary immunodeficiency - primary transcript - primer - primer extension - probe - processivity - promoter - pronucleus - prostate cancer - protease - protein - Protein translocation - proto-oncogene - pseudogene - pseudoknot - pseudorevertant - pulse sequence database - pulsed field gel electrophoresis - purine - PyrC leader - pyrimidine

R 
random primed synthesis - reading frame - recessive - recognition sequence - recombinant DNA - recombination - recombination-repair - relaxed DNA - repetitive DNA - replica plating - reporter gene - repression - repressor - residue - response element - restriction - restriction endonuclease - restriction enzyme - restriction fragment - restriction fragment length polymorphism (RFLP) - restriction fragments - restriction map - restriction site - reticulocyte lysate - retrovirus - reverse transcriptase - reverse transcription - revertant - ribonuclease - ribonuclease - ribonucleic acid - riboprobe - ribosomal binding sequence - ribosome - ribozyme - risk communication - RNA polymerase - RNA splicing - RNAi - RNase - RNase protection assay - rRNA - RT-PCR - Run-on - runoff transcript

S 
S1 end mapping - S1 nuclease - satellite DNA - screening - SDS-PAGE - secondary structure - selection - selenium responsive proteins - sense strand - sequence - sequence motif - sequence polymorphism - sequence-tagged site - sequential epitope - severe combined immunodeficiency - sex chromosome - sex-linked - Shine-Dalgarno sequence - shotgun cloning - shotgun cloning or sequencing - shotgun sequencing - shuttle vector - Siah interacting protein N-terminal domain - sickle-cell disease - side chain - sigma factor - signal peptidase - signal sequence - silent mutation - single nucleotide polymorphism - siRNA - site-directed mutagenesis - site-specific recombination - Slc22a21 - slot blot - SNP - Slc22a21 - snRNA - snRNP - solution hybridization - somatic cells - Southern blot - southwestern blot - SP6 RNA polymerase - SpAB protein domain - spectral karyotype - splicing - Simple Sequence Repeats (SSR) - SPR domain - stable transfection - start codon - stem-loop - sticky end - stomoxyn - stop codon - streptavidin - stringency - structural motif - sub-cloning - substitution - suicide gene - supercoil - SurE, survival protein E - syndrome -

T 
T7 RNA polymerase - taq polymerase - TATA box - Tbf5 protein domain - technology transfer - template - termination codon - terminator - tertiary structure - tet resistance - TGF beta Activation - thymine - tissue-specific expression - tm - trans - transcript - transcription - transcription factor - transcription/translation reaction - transcriptional start site - transfection - transformation (genetics) - transformation (with respect to bacteria) - transfection (with respect to cultured cells) - transgene - transgenic - transient transfection - transition - translation - transposition - transposon - transversion - triplet - trisomy - tRNA - TUG-UBL1 protein domain - tumor suppressor - tumor suppressor gene -

U 
UbiD protein domain - untranslated RNA - upstream - upstream activator sequence - upstream DNA - upstream (transduction) - uracil -

V 
VanY protein domain - Var1 protein domain - vector - VEK-30 protein domain - Vitamin D binding protein domain III - Vitelline membrane outer layer protein I (VMO-I) -

W 
WAC protein domain - Western blot - WHEP-TRS protein domain - wildtype - wobble position - Wolfram syndrome - WWE protein domain -

X 
XPC-binding - XPG I protein domain - Xyloglucan endo-transglycosylase -

Y 
YAC (yeast artificial chromosome) - Ycf9 protein domain - YchF-GTPase C terminal protein domain - Ydc2 protein domain - YDG SRA protein domain - YecM bacterial protein domain - YjeF N terminal protein domain - YopH, N-terminal - YopR bacterial protein domain - Y Y Y -

Z 
zinc finger -

See also 
 Index of biochemistry articles

Molecular biology articles

Molecular biology
Molecular-biology-related lists